Concepción (also known as Yaguareté Corá in Guaraní) is a town in Corrientes Province, Argentina.

It is the capital of Concepción Department.

External links
 Federal website

Populated places in Corrientes Province